Jwalamukhi is a 2000 Indian Hindi-language action film directed by Jagdish A Sharma, starring Mithun Chakraborty and Chunkey Pandey. The movie was partly inspired by the 1985 Hollywood film Commando.

Plot 
A veteran cop Inspector Jwala Singh tries to change village rules, but he is killed by village goons. Then, his spirit starts to haunt them. He also helps his fellow cop fight against his killers.

Cast
Mithun Chakraborty as senior Police Inspector Jwala Singh
Shraddha Sharma as Mala
Chunkey Pandey as Police Inspector Bhole Raj Singh
Mink Singh as Roma
Johny Lever as police constable Himmat Singh
Dolly Bindra as Himmat Singh's wife
Mukesh Rishi as Ranga Rao
Deepak Shirke as Mangal Lohar
Jack Gaud as Vinkantesh
Arjun (Firoz Khan) as Nagarjuna
Shahbaz Khan as Sir David
Shehzad Khan as Private Police Rana Jung Bahadur
Sanjay Mishra as police constable 
Kiran Kumar as Police inspector
Sheeba as item number
Vinay Edekar as Garga

Soundtrack 

The music of the film was composed Anand-Milind and the lyrics were penned by Sameer. The soundtrack was released in 1999 on Audio Cassette in Bombino Music, which consists of 4 songs. The full album is recorded by Sudesh Bhosle, Poornima, Abhijeet, Vinod Rathod, Sonu Nigam, and Jaspinder Narula.

References

External links
 
 Full Hyderabad review

2000 films
2000s Hindi-language films
Films scored by Anand–Milind
Mithun's Dream Factory films
Films shot in Ooty
Indian action films